Netomi, formerly msg.ai, is an American artificial intelligence company and developer of human–computer interaction technologies.

History 

Founded in May 2015 by Puneet Mehta, Netomi was recruited by the global media and advertising agency, Universal McCann, to assist clients Heinz and BMW.

Netomi worked with Sony Pictures to launch the first ever bot on Facebook Messenger for a $100M film, Goosebumps and subsequently joined Y Combinator as a member of the Winter 2016 class.

Netomi later partnered with Facebook’s Creative Shop and the Tommy Hilfiger fashion brand to develop a brand-specific bot with the goal of outperforming existing retail shopping bots.

In 2016 there was an update to the platform to incorporate multivariate testing. This type of testing, unlike traditional A/B testing, permits the monitoring of user interaction with the bot, adjustments to the bot’s tone, and experiments with the use of media.

In 2018, the company changed its name to Netomi. In 2021, the company raised $30 million in a Series B funding round led by WndrCo LLC, a technology and media investment firm co-founded by Hollywood mogul Jeffrey Katzenberg.

Methodology 
Netomi's deep reinforcement learning platform allows for conversational AI and chatbots which engage through personalized interactions at scale and one-to-one relationships throughout the entire user experience.

Netomi utilizes artificial intelligence to automate customized messages and engage in natural dialogues with deep reinforcement learning. This allows the bot to interact in a conversational manner and in a number of ways, including offering product recommendations based on user preferences, answering questions regarding availability and pricing, guiding customers towards a purchase, and providing assistance to complex issues.

Partners and customers 
Netomi has collaborated with messaging platforms, creative agencies, and technology providers to build conversational AI for brands such as WestJet, Zinus and Harry RosenHeinz, BMW, Tommy Hilfiger, and Signal.

See also
 Artificial intelligence
 Chatbot

References

Computer companies established in 2015
Deep learning
Privately held companies based in California
American companies established in 2015